Xingtai County was a former county administered by the prefecture-level city of the same name, in the southwest of Hebei province, China, bordering Shanxi province to the west. It surrounds the two core districts of Xingtai on all sides except the south, though its seat of government is located in neighbouring Qiaodong District. It's now split between Xindu and Xiangdu districts.

Administrative divisions
The county administers 1 subdistrict, 13 towns, and 6 townships.

Subdistricts:
Yurangqiao Subdistrict

References

External links

County-level divisions of Hebei